Turku City Hall is a Neo-Renaissance building located on the bank of the Aura River in Turku, Finland. The City Council of Turku convenes at Turku City Hall. The Mayor used to work in an Art Nouveau building near to the City Hall, the Turku City Office until 2011. 

It was originally designed by Charles Bassi from 1810-1811 as the restaurant Seurahuone. The building survived the Great Fire of Turku in 1827. It was redone 1879-1883 as the city hall under plans by Frans A. Sjöström.

The first floor used to have the register office of Turku up until 1975 and Turku district court until 1997. After the district court of Turku moved to the new Turku courthouse, the first floor was replaced by work, meeting and legislative spaces in 1999. The second floor of the building is decorated with gold and massive crystal crowning. The wing of the building, located on Aurakatu 4, is for city council groups' rooms and travel agency services.   

The public can enter the building during specific events such as Turku Day. The public is also permitted to witness the city council assembly.

References

External links 
 Turku City Hall on the City of Turku webpages

Renaissance Revival architecture
City and town halls in Finland
Government buildings completed in 1811